Qaryat ahl hidran is a village in south-western Yemen. It is located in the Abyan Governorate.

External links
Towns and villages in the Abyan Governorate

Populated places in Abyan Governorate
Villages in Yemen